Whakarongo is a suburb of Palmerston North, New Zealand, between the city and Ashhurst. It is mainly rural, and features many vegetable gardens.

Whakarongo was originally named Stoney Creek and along with neighbouring Kelvin Grove was part of the Stoney Creek Scandinavian and Roadmen's Block. The area was one of the first Special Settlements established by the Government (along with Karere Scandinavian Block, between Awapuni and Longburn).

The original Scandinavian settlers were the first to arrive under Vogel's Immigration and Public Works Scheme. The majority arrived on the second ship (England) which arrived in April 1871, with a handful from the first ship (Celaeno) which arrived in February 1871. The Roadmen were mainly the British 'workmates' of the Scandinavian settlers.

Kelvin Grove Cemetery was established in Whakarongo in 1927.

There are no parks in the area.

State Highway 3 passes through Whakarongo on Napier Road. Stoney Creek Road, named after the original settlement, connects the area with Bunnythorpe.

Demographics

There were 570 households. There were 834 males and 813 females, giving a sex ratio of 1.03 males per female. The median age was 43.5 years (compared with 37.4 years nationally), with 318 people (19.3%) aged under 15 years, 285 (17.3%) aged 15 to 29, 795 (48.4%) aged 30 to 64, and 246 (15.0%) aged 65 or older.

Ethnicities were 90.5% European/Pākehā, 9.3% Māori, 0.9% Pacific peoples, 4.2% Asian, and 2.0% other ethnicities (totals add to more than 100% since people could identify with multiple ethnicities).

The proportion of people born overseas was 11.3%, compared with 27.1% nationally.

Although some people objected to giving their religion, 51.3% had no religion, 41.2% were Christian, 0.2% were Muslim, 0.4% were Buddhist and 1.5% had other religions.

Of those at least 15 years old, 285 (21.5%) people had a bachelor or higher degree, and 237 (17.9%) people had no formal qualifications. The median income was $39,900, compared with $31,800 nationally. The employment status of those at least 15 was that 723 (54.5%) people were employed full-time, 234 (17.6%) were part-time, and 24 (1.8%) were unemployed.

Education

References

Suburbs of Palmerston North
Populated places in Manawatū-Whanganui
Populated places on the Manawatū River